In the mathematical area of graph theory, a chordal graph is one in which all cycles of four or more vertices have a chord, which is an edge that is not part of the cycle but connects two vertices of the cycle. Equivalently, every induced cycle in the graph should have exactly three vertices. The chordal graphs may also be characterized as the graphs that have perfect elimination orderings, as the graphs in which each minimal separator is a clique, and as the intersection graphs of subtrees of a tree.  They are sometimes also called rigid circuit graphs or  triangulated graphs.

Chordal graphs are a subset of the perfect graphs. They may be recognized in linear time, and several problems that are hard on other classes of graphs such as graph coloring may be solved in polynomial time when the input is chordal. The treewidth of an arbitrary graph may be characterized by the size of the cliques in the chordal graphs that contain it.

Perfect elimination and efficient recognition
A perfect elimination ordering in a graph is an ordering of the vertices of the graph such that, for each vertex ,  and the neighbors of  that occur after  in the order form a clique. A graph is chordal if and only if it has a perfect elimination ordering.

 (see also ) show that a perfect elimination ordering of a chordal graph may be found efficiently using an algorithm known as lexicographic breadth-first search. This algorithm maintains a partition of the vertices of the graph into a sequence of sets; initially this sequence consists of a single set with all vertices. When this splitting process has been performed for all vertices, the sequence of sets has one vertex per set, in the reverse of a perfect elimination ordering.

Since both this lexicographic breadth first search process and the process of testing whether an ordering is a perfect elimination ordering can be performed in linear time, it is possible to recognize chordal graphs in linear time.  The graph sandwich problem on chordal graphs is NP-complete whereas the probe graph problem on chordal graphs has polynomial-time complexity.

The set of all perfect elimination orderings of a chordal graph can be modeled as the basic words of an antimatroid;  use this connection to antimatroids as part of an algorithm for efficiently listing all perfect elimination orderings of a given chordal graph.

Maximal cliques and graph coloring
Another application of perfect elimination orderings is finding a maximum clique of a chordal graph in polynomial-time, while the same problem for general graphs is NP-complete. More generally, a chordal graph can have only linearly many maximal cliques, while non-chordal graphs may have exponentially many.

The clique graphs of chordal graphs are the dually chordal graphs.

The largest maximal clique is a maximum clique, and, as chordal graphs are perfect, the size of this clique equals the chromatic number of the chordal graph. Chordal graphs are perfectly orderable: an optimal coloring may be obtained by applying a greedy coloring algorithm to the vertices in the reverse of a perfect elimination ordering.

The chromatic polynomial of a chordal graph is easy to compute.  Find a perfect elimination ordering .  Let  equal the number of neighbors of  that come after  in that ordering.  For instance, .  The chromatic polynomial equals   (The last factor is simply , so  divides the polynomial, as it should.)  Clearly, this computation depends on chordality.

Minimal separators
In any graph, a vertex separator is a set of vertices the removal of which leaves the remaining graph disconnected; a separator is minimal if it has no proper subset that is also a separator.

That is, they are the graphs that have a recursive decomposition by clique separators into smaller subgraphs. For this reason, chordal graphs have also sometimes been called decomposable graphs.

Intersection graphs of subtrees

From a collection of subtrees of a tree, one can define a subtree graph, which is an intersection graph that has one vertex per subtree and an edge connecting any two subtrees that overlap in one or more nodes of the tree. Gavril showed that the subtree graphs are exactly the chordal graphs.

A representation of a chordal graph as an intersection of subtrees forms a tree decomposition of the graph, with treewidth equal to one less than the size of the largest clique in the graph; the tree decomposition of any graph G can be viewed in this way as a representation of G as a subgraph of a chordal graph. The tree decomposition of a graph is also the junction tree of the junction tree algorithm.

Relation to other graph classes

Subclasses
Interval graphs are the intersection graphs of subtrees of path graphs, a special case of trees. Therefore, they are a subfamily of chordal graphs.

Split graphs are graphs that are both chordal and the complements of chordal graphs.  showed that, in the limit as  goes to infinity, the fraction of -vertex chordal graphs that are split approaches one.

Ptolemaic graphs are graphs that are both chordal and distance hereditary.
Quasi-threshold graphs are a subclass of Ptolemaic graphs that are both chordal and cographs. Block graphs are another subclass of Ptolemaic graphs in which every two maximal cliques have at most one vertex in common. A special type is windmill graphs, where the common vertex is the same for every pair of cliques.

Strongly chordal graphs are graphs that are chordal and contain no -sun (for ) as an induced subgraph. Here an -sun is an -vertex chordal graph  together with a collection of  degree-two vertices, adjacent to the edges of a Hamiltonian cycle in .

-trees are chordal graphs in which all maximal cliques and all maximal clique separators have the same size. Apollonian networks are chordal maximal planar graphs, or equivalently planar 3-trees. Maximal outerplanar graphs are a subclass of 2-trees, and therefore are also chordal.

Superclasses
Chordal graphs are a subclass of the well known perfect graphs. 
Other superclasses of chordal graphs include weakly chordal graphs, cop-win graphs, odd-hole-free graphs, even-hole-free graphs, and Meyniel graphs. Chordal graphs are precisely the graphs that are both odd-hole-free and even-hole-free (see holes in graph theory).

Every chordal graph is a strangulated graph, a graph in which every peripheral cycle is a triangle, because peripheral cycles are a special case of induced cycles. Strangulated graphs are graphs that can be formed by clique-sums of chordal graphs and maximal planar graphs. Therefore, strangulated graphs include maximal planar graphs.

Chordal completions and treewidth

The parameterized version of minimum fill-in is fixed parameter tractable, and moreover, is solvable in parameterized subexponential time.  
The -trees are the graphs to which no additional edges can be added without increasing their treewidth to a number larger than .
Therefore, the -trees are their own chordal completions, and form a subclass of the chordal graphs. Chordal completions can also be used to characterize several other related classes of graphs.

Notes

References
.
.
.
.
.
.
.
.
.
.
.
.
.
.
.
.
.
.
.

External links 
 Information System on Graph Class Inclusions: chordal graph

Graph families
Perfect graphs
Intersection classes of graphs